= Ageing of newspaper readership =

Ageing of people who read newspapers

Newspaper readership is the people who read or are thought to read a particular newspaper, or newspapers in general. Ageing of newspaper readership means that the average age (however defined) of readers is increasing. This may or may not be accompanied by a decline in total readership numbers. However currently, in many regions, readership is both ageing and declining.

This may be because younger people are increasingly using other sources of news (e.g. online newspaper articles or other news websites, or free newspapers) or in some cases are not accessing news at all.

== Statistics ==
Canadian newspaper readership has decreased every year since 2007 and the revenue of Canadian newspapers is slow. Canada's newspaper readership is also ageing, perhaps partly because the population of Canada as a whole is ageing. Though Canadians become more interested in reading newspapers as they age, this has less of an impact.

The growth of newspaper market has stopped in 2007 and decline since 2008. Newspaper circulation had declined 34% in 2009 compared to 2004.

The U.S. population is ageing, but media consumers' speed of ageing is faster than the overall population (Economist) and this also applies to newspaper readership. Middle-age consumers are considered as the potential consumers rather than younger people. Printed newspapers are being abandoned by the young more than by any other age group.

== Factors ==
=== Long-term cohort effect ===
In demography, a cohort is a group of people with the same year (or group of adjacent years) of birth. Sometimes different cohorts have different characteristics; this is called a cohort effect.

There may be a cohort effect for newspaper readership: younger cohorts appear to read fewer newspapers than older cohort groups, even though newspapers generally target a wide range of age groups. As time passes, older cohorts will die out and be replaced by younger cohorts, resulting in a decline in newspaper readership.

=== Online news ===
The internet is becoming one of the main resources for receiving information. Online news readership is increasing as newspaper readership decreases, assisted by gadgets such as computers, cell phones and tablets. The Columbian Journalism Review found that "succeeding generations growing up with the Web lose the habit of reading print". The marginal cost of accessing news on line is much less than buying newspapers. Thus households with internet access are more likely to end newspaper subscriptions; all the more in urban areas than the rural areas as (in some parts of the world) these have a more stable and high-speed broadband service.

== Impact ==
Newspapers are a key source of new political, economic and social information for public consumption. If people do not keep up with the news, they are likely to be less aware of or concerned by local, national and international events. Thus political participation is likely to decline, as are civic awareness and democratic values. Newspapers tend to cover the news in more detail than on-line and other sources; thus readers are more able to consider political issues than e.g. those who gain political information from TV.

People with lower socio-economic status (SES) receive information slower than people with higher socio-economic status, as on average they are less educated and may have less time to spend on reading information (they spend more time on working to maintain living quality), and can spend less on access to information. However, there are many exceptions. Young consumers of the newspaper are people with lower socio-economic status, they read less, spend less time on reading newspaper and require a smaller amount of information compared to the older consumers. As the people with lower SES reduce time to read newspapers, their social/political knowledge will decrease at the same time which widens the knowledge gap between people with higher SES and lower SES. People with lower SES tend to gain information from TV, but this tends to present information in a biased and/or dumbed-down way. However so do many newspapers.

== See also ==
- Newspaper
- Online newspaper
- Newspaper circulation
